Afroscirpoides is a genus of flowering plants belonging to the family Cyperaceae.

Its native range is Southern Africa.

Species:

Afroscirpoides dioeca

References

Cyperaceae
Cyperaceae genera